The Jena Band of Choctaw Indians are one of three federally recognized Choctaw tribes in the United States. They are based in La Salle, Catahoula, and Grant parishes in the U.S. state of Louisiana. The Jena Band received federal recognition in 1995 and has a reservation in Grant Parish. Their headquarters are at Jena, Louisiana. Tribal membership totals 327.

History
The Jena Band of Choctaw Indians are related to the federally recognized Mississippi Band of Choctaw Indians. Both bands descend from Choctaws that remained behind in Mississippi when the Choctaw Nation was removed to Indian Territory in the 1830s after signing the Treaty of Dancing Rabbit Creek. Between 1870 and 1880 ancestors of the Jena Band left Mississippi and settled in central Louisiana. Ten core families that included the surnames Lewis, Allen, Gibson, and Jackson, came to reside on plantations owned by the Bowie and Whatley families near Jena, Louisiana. Most worked as sharecroppers, domestics, or day laborers. A dependent and paternalistic relationship developed between the Bowie and Whatley families and the Choctaw group as witnessed by the fact band members were known locally as the "Bowie Indians" or the "Whatley Indians." Many Choctaws were forced to buy goods on credit at the Whatley family store on their plantation. The Choctaws also grew gardens for their own subsistence. Choctaw men tanned deer hides and women made baskets for sale. 

The original ten families were known as "full-blood" Choctaws in the local area. The Jena Band was isolated until the 1950s on Whatley and Bowie lands, having limited contact with area whites because of Choctaw determination to maintain their community and discrimination. Members of the group spoke Choctaw and maintained Choctaw names. John Allen, for example, was also known by his traditional name, Hatubbe. Jena Choctaws largely intermarried within the small group until the 1950s. They maintained Choctaw traditions such as language and folklore. Some members travelled to Muskogee, Indian Territory, in 1902 to appear before the Dawes Commission. Testimony they presented revealed that most Jena Choctaw applicants were monolingual in Choctaw. Well into the 1930s, sources report that most group members spoke Choctaw and no English. 

Until the 1930s the small Jena Choctaw group received no assistance from the Bureau of Indian Affairs. As part of President Franklin Roosevelt's "Indian New Deal," federal officials sought to aid non-federally recognized Indians in the Southeast that had maintained significant indigenous ancestry and community cohesion. The Bureau of Indian Affairs established a school for Jena Choctaw children during the decade. The first teacher noted that the children could not speak English and were in dire need of educational assistance. Because of the Jena Choctaw band's small size, poverty, and isolation, federal officials planned to remove the families to the Mississippi Band of Choctaw Indians Reservation in the late 1930s. Funding shortages stymied this effort. 

By the 1960s many Choctaws had moved away from Jena to take jobs in growing urban areas such as New Orleans and Houston. The core Jena Choctaw community remained, however, on lands near Jena. During the 1960s, Jena Choctaws generally remained aloof from the growing Indian activism of Louisiana and other states in the Southeast. Traditional leadership flowed to the oldest male in the community. In 1968, the last traditional leader, William Lewis, died, and younger Jena Choctaws began agitating for economic change and acknowledgement of their rights as indigenous Americans. An outgrowth of the Indian renaissance of the era, the newly created Louisiana Governor's Office on Indian Affairs sought to organize the band. In the early 1970s it helped younger Jena Choctaw leaders write a formal constitution. It established formal government structures and electoral procedures. It established formal membership criteria for the first time, with a one-quarter Choctaw blood quantum required for citizenship in the Jena Band of Choctaw Indians. In 1974, Jerry Jackson was elected its first Chairman. With a federal Department of Housing and Urban Development (HUD) grant, the band built a tribal center. With a federal grant from the Administration for Native Americans, the Jena Band researched and wrote a petition for formal federal tribal recognition through the Bureau of Indian Affairs' Federal Acknowledgment Process in the early 1980s. The Band also pursued tribal recognition legislation after 1980. In 1995, the federal government acknowledged the Jena Band as a federally-recognized tribe though the Bureau of Indian Affairs' process.

Government
The tribe is headquartered in Jena, Louisiana. Their elected Principal Chief of the Jena Band is Libby Rogers

Reservation
The Jena Band of Choctaw Reservation is located in two separate parts in Grant Parish, in and near the village of Creola. The larger section is located northwest of the village, while the smaller section is located within the village.

Culture

Choctaw culture has greatly evolved over the centuries, absorbing mostly European-American influences. It was also shaped by and contributed to Spanish, French, and English colonial cultures. They were known for their rapid incorporation of modernity, developing a written language, transitioning to yeoman farming methods, and accepting European Americans and African Americans into their society by birth, adoption or marriage.

References

External links

Jena Band of Choctaw Indians, official website

 
Native American tribes in Louisiana
Federally recognized tribes in the United States